The 2013 VTV Cup Championship was the 10th staging. The tournament was held at the Ninh Binh Province Gymnasium in Ninh Binh, Vietnam.

Pools composition

 Vietnam (Host)
 Jiangsu
 Shandong
 Australia   
 Kazakhstan U23   
 Thailand U20

Preliminary round

|}

|}

|}

|}

|}

 
|}

Final round

Bracket

Semifinals

|}

5th place

|}

3rd place

|}

Final

|}

Final standing

Awards
MVP:  Vietnam Nguyễn Thị Ngọc Hoa
Best Spiker:  Jiangsu ECE Volleyball Liu Peiyi
Best Blocker:  Vietnam Bùi Thị Ngà
Best Server:  Jiangsu ECE Volleyball Xu Ruoya
Best Setter:  Shandong Laishang Bank Sun Weijing
Best Receiver:  Jiangsu ECE Volleyball Wang Chenyue
Best Libero:  Jiangsu ECE Volleyball Hu Yuxuan
Miss Volleyball:  Kazakhstan U23 Batkuldina Aliya

References

VTV International Women's Volleyball Cup
VTV
VTV